Assahara is a town in south-central Ivory Coast. It is a sub-prefecture of M'Batto Department in Moronou Region, Lacs District.

Assahara was a commune until March 2012, when it became one of 1,126 communes nationwide that were abolished.

In 2014, the population of the sub-prefecture of Assahara was 7,227.

Villages
The 7 villages of the sub-prefecture of Assahara and their population in 2014 are:
 Adouakouakro (2 254)
 Assahara (1 242)
 Assiébosson Kouman (146)
 Bouafoukro (1 099)
 Komambo (324)
 Kouakro (1 462)
 N'drikro (700)

References

Sub-prefectures of Moronou Region
Former communes of Ivory Coast